Lelemi or Lefana (Lε-lεmi, Lε-fana) is spoken by the Buem people in the mountainous Volta Region of Ghana. It belongs to the geographic group of Ghana Togo Mountain languages (traditionally called the Togorestsprachen or Togo Remnant languages) of the Kwa branch of Niger–Congo.

References

Languages of Ghana
Ghana–Togo Mountain languages